UIB is a station on the Palma Metro. It is situated on the south side of the main campus of University of the Balearic Islands, which is located in northern part of Palma on the island of Majorca, Spain.

The station, which was opened 25 April 2007 by Catherine Cirer, mayor of Palma de Mallorca, is the northerly terminus of the line.

References

Palma Metro stations
Railway stations in Spain opened in 2007